Colonel Denys Richard Martin (11 October 1892 – 1970) was a distinguished 20th century philatelist. As a systematic scholar and prolific writer, Martin illuminated some of the most difficult topics and set a high standard for the study of the postage stamps and postal history of India and Burma.

Life
As a regular British Army officer of the Royal Engineers, Martin arrived in India during the First World War and travelled throughout the subcontinent during the next twenty years.

Philately
Martin's collection included postal history material from the Persian Field Force, the Abyssinian campaigns and the Treaty Ports, which are now in the Government of India's collection.

He was a member of the India Study Circle.

Awards
 Fellow of the Royal Philatelic Society London (FRPSL).
 Crawford Medal for The Four Annas Lithographed Stamps of India, 1854-55, 1932.
 Signed the Roll of Distinguished Philatelists in 1939.

Publications
 Half Anna Lithographed Stamps of India. 1928. (With E.A. Smythies)
 The Four Annas Lithographed Stamps of India, 1854-55. London: Philatelic Society of India and Stanley Gibbons, 1930. (With E.A. Smythies)
 Five appendices in L. E. Dawson, The One Anna and Two Annas Postage Stamps of India, 1854-55. Philatelic Society of India, H. Garratt-Adams & Co. and Stanley Gibbons, Ltd., London (1948):  Die I, A Stone, No. 7 - p. 66; Die I, B Stone, Nos. 2, 28 and 64 - p. 67; India, 1854. Pin Perforated - p. 73; One Anna, 1854, Numbers Printed - p. 75; and The Two Annas, 1854, Some Problems - p. 81..
 Pakistan Overprints on Indian Stamps, 1948-49, London: Robson Lowe, 1959.
 The Second Afghan War. 1961.
 The Bombay-Karachi Sea Post Office. 1963. (With G.C. Danby)
 Indian Travelling Post Offices 1864-1891. London: Robson Lowe, 1969. First printed in The Philatelist.
 Numbers in Early Indian Cancellations, London: Robson Lowe, 1970.
 Burma Postal History, Including the 1987 Supplement. London: Robson Lowe, 1971. (With Gerald Davis.)
 Overseas Letter Postage from India 1854-1876. 1975. (editor with Neil Blair)

References

British Army personnel of World War I
Royal Engineers officers
British philatelists
1892 births
1970 deaths
Fellows of the Royal Philatelic Society London
Philately of India
Signatories to the Roll of Distinguished Philatelists